The Hardest Part can refer to:

 The Hardest Part (Allison Moorer album), an album by Allison Moorer released in 2000
 The Hardest Part (Noah Cyrus album), an album by Noah Cyrus released in 2022
 "The Hardest Part" (Blondie song), 1980
 "The Hardest Part" (Coldplay song), 2006
 "The Hardest Part", a song by Nina Nesbitt from her 2014 album Peroxide